LIPC can refer to:

Electrolaser (Laser-Induced Plasma Channel)
LIPC gene encoding hepatic lipase
The ICAO code for Cervia Air Force Base